Danny Dunn and the Fossil Cave is the sixth novel in the Danny Dunn series of juvenile science fiction/adventure books written by Raymond Abrashkin and Jay Williams. The book was first published in 1961.

Plot 
Danny and his friend Joe Pearson discover the entrance to a cave in the woods near their home.  Professor Bulfinch has just invented a portable x-ray machine, and he, along with his geologist friend Dr. Tresselt see an opportunity to use the device in the cave.  The two adults, along with Danny, Joe, and Irene, enter the cave on an expedition. They make an astonishing discovery, but they encounter a significant problem which prevents them from leaving the cave.

Editions 
McGraw-Hill
 (Paperback, 1961, illustrated by Brinton Turkel)
 (Hardback, 1961, illustrated by Brinton Turkel)

MacDonald and Jane's
 (Hardback, 1971, illustrated by Anne Mieke)

Archway Books
 (Paperback, 1979, #11 in their series)

Pocket Books
 (Paperback, 1983 reissue, illustrated by Brinton Turkel)

References

Danny Dunn
1961 American novels
1961 children's books
1961 science fiction novels